"Johnny Delusional" is a song by musical supergroup FFS, consisting of members from the bands Franz Ferdinand and Sparks. The song was released as the lead single from the group's eponymous debut studio album on 13 April 2015. The official music video for the song was uploaded to YouTube on 19 May 2015. The song peaked at number 90 on the Belgian Flanders Tip singles chart.

Music video
The official music video for the song, lasting three minutes and twenty-two seconds, was uploaded on 19 May 2015 to the group's Vevo channel on YouTube. The video was directed by video directing group AB/CD/CD and was produced by video producer Lucile Weigel.

Track listing

Personnel
Personnel adapted from the album's liner notes

FFS
Alex Kapranos – lead vocals, guitar, keyboard, and composing
Nick McCarthy – backing vocals, guitar, keyboard, and composing
Bob Hardy – backing vocals, bass guitar, and composing
Paul Thomson – backing vocals, drums, and composing
Russell Mael – lead vocals and composing
Ron Mael – backing vocals, keyboard, and composing

Production personnel
Greg Calbi – mastering
John Congleton – production and engineering
Mike Horner – engineering
Cenzo Townshend – mixing

Charts

Release history

References

External links

2015 debut singles
2015 songs
Franz Ferdinand (band) songs
Sparks (band) songs
Songs written by Alex Kapranos
Songs written by Bob Hardy (bassist)
Songs written by Ron Mael
Songs written by Russell Mael
Songs written by Nick McCarthy
Domino Recording Company singles
Song recordings produced by John Congleton